Maccabi Bnot Ashdod is a professional women's basketball team based in Ashdod, playing in the Ligat Ha'al in Israel since 2003. It is the women's basketball division of the Maccabi Ashdod sports club.

During 2009/10, the team reached the finals of the championship. But lost to A.S. Ramat-Hasharon 1–3.
A year later (2010/11), the team reached the finals again, and lost to the team of Elitzur Ramla 0–3.

In 2011/12 season, the team participated in the EuroCup for the first time. Later Maccabi Bnot Ashdod won national Cup taking over A.S. Ramat-Hasharon in the final. At the end of the season Maccabi Bnot Ashdod for the first time won the Championship, completing the Double In the final series they won Elitzur Ramla 3–2.

Winner Cup 
Early season 2009/10 the team won the "Winner Cup", after winning the set 82-84 Elitzur Ramla. Officially opening the tournament season, which was held at Kibbutz Yad Mordechai. American foreign Ashdod Natasha Lacy was selected for the finals MVP.

Honors and achievements

Domestic 
 Ligat Ha'al 
 Winners: 2011–12, 2013–14, 2014–15, 2015–16, 2016–17
 Runners-up: 2009–10, 2010–11, 2012–13
 Israeli Cup 
 Winners: 2011–12, 2012–13, 2015–16
 Elizur Cup 
 Winners: 2010, 2014

International 
 EuroCup Women 
 Semifinals: 2014–15

Current roster
(as of March 2023)

Former players

See also

Maccabi Ashdod B.C.
Maccabi Ironi Ashdod F.C.

References

Women's basketball teams in Israel
Basketball teams established in 1991
Ashdod
Sport in Ashdod
1974 establishments in Israel